Lawrence Welk (March 11, 1903 – May 17, 1992) was an American accordionist, bandleader, and television impresario, who hosted The Lawrence Welk Show from 1951 to 1982. His style came to be known as "champagne music" to his radio, television, and live-performance audiences.

Early life
Welk was born in the German-speaking community of Strasburg, North Dakota. He was sixth of the eight children of Ludwig and Christiana (née Schwahn) Welk, Roman Catholic ethnic Germans who emigrated in 1892 from Odessa, Russian Empire (now Ukraine).

Welk was a first cousin, once removed, of former Montana governor Brian Schweitzer (Welk's mother and Schweitzer's paternal grandmother were siblings). Welk's paternal great-great-grandparents, Moritz and Magdalena Welk, emigrated in 1808 from Germanophone Alsace-Lorraine to Ukraine.

The family lived on a homestead that is now a tourist attraction. They spent the cold North Dakota winter of their first year inside an upturned wagon covered in sod. Welk left school during fourth grade to work full-time on the family farm.

Welk decided on a career in music and persuaded his father to buy a mail-order accordion for $400 (equivalent to $ in ) He promised his father that he would work on the farm until he was 21, in repayment for the accordion. Any money he made elsewhere during that time, doing farmwork or performing, would go to his family.

Welk did not learn to speak English until he was twenty-one and never felt comfortable speaking it in public. Welk became an iconic figure in the German-Russian community of the northern Great Plains—his success story personified the American dream.

Early career
On his 21st birthday, having fulfilled his promise to his father, Welk left the family farm to pursue a career in music. During the 1920s, he performed with various bands before forming an orchestra. He led big bands in North Dakota and eastern South Dakota, including the Hotsy Totsy Boys and the Honolulu Fruit Gum Orchestra. His band was also the station band for the popular radio programming WNAX in Yankton, South Dakota. The Lawrence Welk Orchestra scored an immediate success and began a daily radio show, which lasted from 1927 to 1936. The radio show led to many well-paying engagements for the band throughout the midwestern states. In 1927, he graduated from the MacPhail School of Music in Minneapolis, Minnesota.

Although many associate Welk's music with a style quite separate from jazz, he recorded one notable song in a ragtime style in November 1928 for Gennett Records, based in Richmond, Indiana: "Spiked Beer", featuring Welk and his Novelty Orchestra.

During the 1930s, Welk led a traveling big band specializing in dance tunes and "sweet" music (during this period, bands performing light-melodic music were referred to as "sweet bands" to distinguish them from the more rhythmic and assertive "hot" bands of artists like Benny Goodman and Duke Ellington). Initially, the band traveled around the country by car. They were too poor to rent rooms, so they usually slept and changed clothes in their cars. The term champagne music was derived from an engagement at the William Penn Hotel in Pittsburgh, after a dancer referred to his band's sound as "light and bubbly as champagne." The hotel also lays claim to the original "bubble machine," a prop left over from a 1920s movie premiere. Welk described his band's sound, saying, "We still play music with the champagne style, which means light and rhythmic. We place the stress on melody; the chords are played pretty much the way the composer wrote them. We play with a steady beat so dancers can follow it."

Welk's big band performed across the country, but particularly in the Chicago and Milwaukee areas. In the early 1940s, the band began a 10-year stint at the Trianon Ballroom in Chicago, regularly drawing crowds of several thousand. His orchestra also performed frequently at the Roosevelt Hotel in New York City during the late 1940s. In 1944 and 1945, Welk led his orchestra in 10 "Soundies", three-minute movie musicals considered to be the early pioneers of music videos.

Welk collaborated with Western artist Red Foley to record a version of Spade Cooley's "Shame on You" in 1945. The record (Decca 18698) was number 4 to Cooley's number 5 on Billboard'''s September 15 "Most Played Juke Box Folk Records" listing. From 1949 through 1951, the band had radio programming on ABC, sponsored by Miller High Life, "The Champagne of Bottled Beer."

In addition to his activities as a performing artist, Welk edited a course of modern music for the piano accordion which included arrangements by John Serry for the U. S. School of Music in New York City in 1953, The school was founded in 1898 and was described years later as the oldest home study music school chartered by the Board of Regents in New York State with a total worldwide enrollment of over one million students.

Recordings
In addition to the above-mentioned "Spiked Beer", Welk's territory band made occasional trips to Richmond, Indiana, and to Grafton, Wisconsin, to record a handful of sessions for the Gennett and Paramount companies. In November 1928 he recorded four sides for Gennett spread over two days (one side was rejected), and in 1931 he recorded eight sides for Paramount (in two sessions) that were issued on the Broadway and Lyric labels. These records are rare and highly valued.

From 1938 to 1940, he recorded frequently in New York and Chicago for Vocalion Records. During this period Welk recorded numerous instrumentals especially for radio stations; these transcription records became a broadcasting staple. Welk signed with Decca Records in 1941, then recorded for Mercury Records and Coral Records for short periods of time before moving to Dot Records in 1959.

In 1967, Welk left Dot Records and joined its former executive Randy Wood in creating Ranwood Records. Welk bought back all his masters from Dot and Coral, and Ranwood became the outlet for all of Welk's many artists. They started with a huge reissue of old Dot albums in 1968 to get them started on the right foot. Wood's interest was sold to Welk in 1979. In 2015, Welk Music Group sold the Vanguard and Sugar Hill labels to Concord Bicycle Music while retaining ownership of the Ranwood catalog. Welk's estate licensed the Ranwood catalogue to Concord Music Group for 10 years.

The Lawrence Welk Show

In 1951, Welk settled in Los Angeles. The same year, he began producing The Lawrence Welk Show on KTLA in Los Angeles, where it was broadcast from the Aragon Ballroom in Venice Beach. The show became a local hit and was picked up by ABC in June 1955.

During its first year on the air, the Welk hour instituted several regular features. To make Welk's "Champagne Music" tagline visual, the production crew engineered a "bubble machine" that spouted streams of large bubbles across the bandstand. While the bubble machine was originally engineered to produce soap bubbles, complaints from the band members about soapy build-ups on their instruments led to the machine being reworked to produce glycerine bubbles instead. During the show's first year, the bubble machine operated continuously, with the bubbles wafting across the musicians' faces and instruments for the entire hour. Within a year, the bubble machine was retired except for the opening and closing "Champagne Music" selections. Whenever the orchestra played a polka or waltz, Welk himself would dance with the band's female vocalist, the "Champagne Lady". This was a long-standing tradition in the Welk band; the first Champagne Lady was Lois Best (1939 to 1941), followed during the war years by Jayne Walton.

Beginning with the Welk show's freshman year, Welk was careful to program current songs in addition to the traditional big-band standards. The Boyd Bennett rock-and-roll hit "My Boy Flat Top" was featured on two different programs (November 26, 1955 and December 10, 1955, the latter featuring Buddy Merrill on electric guitar). The policy was relaxed over the next year, with new songs still being included but now being treated as novelty arrangements. In the December 8, 1956 broadcast, "Nuttin' for Christmas" became a vehicle for Rocky Rockwell dressed in a child's outfit, and Elvis Presley's "Don't Be Cruel" was sung by the violinist Bob Lido, wearing fake Presley-style sideburns. In another episode, the Lennon Sisters and Norma Zimmer performed the Orlons' No. 2 pop hit "The Wah-Watusi" with the bass singer Larry Hooper wearing a beatnik outfit.

These stood in comparison to the contemporary American Bandstand, which catered to a teenager audience and featured the latest acts. In a 1971 episode, Welk infamously billed the Brewer & Shipley single "One Toke Over the Line" (performed as a duet by Gail Farrell and Dick Dale), which referenced the use of marijuana, as a "modern spiritual"; social conservatives of the era saw the song as subversive and it became the first casualty of an attempt by the Federal Communications Commission attempt to get radio stations to ban all pro-drug songs. Later in the 1970s, however, Welk's programs often included current adult contemporary songs performed by his singers, including "Feelings" and "Love Will Keep Us Together" (made famous by Morris Albert and Captain & Tennille, respectively), and current songs were included up through 1982, the final year of production of the show.

Whenever a Dixieland tune was scheduled, Welk harked back to his days with the Hotsy Totsy Boys and enthusiastically led the band. Befitting the target audience, the type of music on The Lawrence Welk Show was conservative, concentrating on popular music standards, show tunes, polkas, and novelty songs, delivered in a smooth, calm, good-humored easy-listening style and "family-oriented" manner. Although described by one critic, Canadian journalist and entertainment editor Frank Rasky, as "the squarest music this side of Euclid", this strategy proved commercially successful, and the show remained on the air for 31 years.

Welk's musicians included accordionist Myron Floren, the concert violinist Dick Kesner, the guitarist Buddy Merrill, and the New Orleans Dixieland clarinetist Pete Fountain. Though Welk was occasionally rumored to be tight with a dollar, he paid his regular band members top scale. Long tenure was common among the regulars. For example, Floren was the band's assistant conductor throughout the show's run. He was noted for spotlighting individual members of his band.

Welk had a number of instrumental hits, including a cover of the song "Yellow Bird". His highest charting record was "Calcutta", written by Heino Gaze, which achieved hit status in 1961. Welk himself was indifferent to the tune, but his musical director, George Cates, said that if Welk did not wish to record the song, he (Cates) would. Welk replied, "Well, if it's good enough for you, George, I guess it's good enough for me." Although the rock-and-roll explosion in the mid-1950s had driven most older artists off the charts, "Calcutta" reached number 1 on the U.S. pop charts between February 13 and 26, 1961; it was recorded in only one take. The tune knocked the Shirelles' "Will You Love Me Tomorrow" out of the number 1 position, and it kept the Miracles' "Shop Around" from becoming the group's first number-1 hit, holding their recording at number 2. It sold more than one million copies and was awarded a gold disc.

The album Calcutta! also achieved number-one status. The albums Last Date, Yellow Bird, Moon River, Young World and Baby Elephant Walk and Theme from the Brothers Grimm, produced in the early 60s, were in Billboards top ten; nine more albums produced between 1956 and 1963 were in the top twenty. His albums continued to chart through 1973.

Welk's insistence on wholesome entertainment led him to be a taskmaster at times. For example, he fired Alice Lon, at the time the show's "Champagne Lady," because he believed she was showing too much leg. Welk told the audience that he would not tolerate such "cheesecake" performances on his show; he later tried unsuccessfully to rehire the singer after fan mail indicated overwhelmingly that viewers opposed her dismissal. He then had a series of short-term "Champagne Ladies" before Norma Zimmer filled that spot on a permanent basis. Highly involved with his stars' personal lives, he often arbitrated their marital disputes.   His musical conservatism caused occasional controversies as well. Despite the authentic New Orleans Dixieland clarinet that made him a popular cast member, Pete Fountain left the orchestra in a dispute with Welk over adding a jazz solo to a Christmas song.

Reflecting the controversies about the quality of Welk's music among the cognoscenti, in 1956, musical satirist Stan Freberg, known for his love of jazz, wrote and recorded a biting Welk satire, "Wunnerful! Wunnerful!" Freberg impersonated Welk. Recorded with some of Hollywood's best jazz musicians, arranged by Billy May to sound like authentic Welk, the single mocked Welk's accordion work, his sometimes-stumbling patter between songs and the music of such Welk favorites Rocky Rockwell ("Stony Stonedwell"), Champagne Lady Alice Lon ("Alice Lean") and Larry Hooper ("Larry Looper"). Welk was not amused, and when he met Freberg years later, claimed he never used the "Wunnerful! Wunnerful!" term. Ironically, it became the title of Welk's 1971 autobiography.

Despite its staid reputation, The Lawrence Welk Show nonetheless kept up with the times and never limited itself strictly to music of the big-band era. During the 1960s and 1970s, for instance, the show incorporated material by such contemporary sources as the Beatles, Burt Bacharach and Hal David, Neil Sedaka, the Everly Brothers and Paul Williams (as well as, in the most notorious example, Brewer & Shipley), all arranged in a format that was easily digestible to older viewers. Originally produced in black and white, in 1957 the show began being recorded on videotape, and it switched to color for the fall 1965 season.

During its network run, The Lawrence Welk Show aired on ABC on Saturday nights at 9 p.m. (Eastern Time), moving up a half-hour to 8:30 p.m. in the fall of 1963. In fact, Welk headlined two weekly prime-time shows on ABC for three years. From 1956 to 1958, he hosted Top Tunes and New Talent, which aired on Monday nights. The series moved to Wednesdays in the fall of 1958 and was renamed The Plymouth Show, which ended in May 1959. During that time, the Saturday show was also known as The Dodge Dancing Party. During this period, the networks were in the process of eliminating programming that was seen as having either too old an audience, did not appeal to urban residents, or both (the so-called Rural Purge). As The Lawrence Welk Show fit into this category, ABC ended its run in 1971. Welk thanked ABC and the sponsors at the end of the last network show. The Lawrence Welk Show continued on as a first-run syndicated program shown on 250 stations across the country until the final original show was produced in 1982, when Welk decided to retire. While many longtime TV shows suffered a serious ratings drop during the counterculture movement of the late 1960s, The Lawrence Welk Show survived largely intact and even had increased viewership during this time, albeit consisting of mostly older viewers. 

For the entire run, musical numbers were divided fairly evenly between prerecorded lip- and finger-sync performances and those recorded live on film or tape. Generally, the big production numbers featuring dancing and singing performances were recorded earlier in the day or the day before, often at famous recording studios in and around nearby Hollywood, while the more intimate numbers were recorded live on tape or film.

After retiring from his show and the road in 1982, Welk continued to air reruns of his shows, which were repackaged first for syndication and, starting in 1986, for public television. He also starred in and produced a pair of Christmas specials in 1984 and 1985.

Business ventures
Welk was a businessman and subsequent to his marriage in 1930, he was the manager of a hotel, restaurant, and music store.

In the late 1950s, he founded Teleklew Inc., which had investments in music publishing, recordings, and real estate. In the 1980s, the company became The Welk Group and subsequently split into Welk Music Group and Welk Resort Group.

Welk was awarded four U.S. design patents for a musically themed restaurant menu, an accordion-themed tray for serving food at a restaurant, an accordion-themed tray for serving food at a restaurant, and an accordion-themed ashtray.

Personal life and death

Welk was married for 61 years, until his death in 1992, to Fern Renner (August 26, 1903 – February 13, 2002), with whom he had two daughters and a son. His son, Lawrence Welk Jr., married and divorced fellow Lawrence Welk Show performer Tanya Falan. Welk was survived by 10 grandchildren and a great-grandchild.

A devout Roman Catholic, Welk was a daily communicant. He was a noted member of The Benevolent and Protective Order of Elks.

Welk died of pneumonia on May 17, 1992, at age 89, at his Santa Monica home, surrounded by his family. He was buried in Holy Cross Cemetery in Culver City, California.

Honors
In 1961, Welk was inducted as a charter member of the Rough Rider Award from his native North Dakota.  In 1967, he received the Horatio Alger Award from the Horatio Alger Association of Distinguished Americans. He later served as the Grand Marshal for the Rose Bowl's Tournament of Roses parade in 1972. Welk received the Golden Plate Award of the American Academy of Achievement in 1980.

In 1994, Welk was inducted into the International Polka Music Hall of Fame.

Welk has a star for recording on the Hollywood Walk of Fame, located at 6613½ Hollywood Boulevard. He has a second star at 1601 Vine Street for television.

In 2007, Welk became a charter member of the Gennett Records Walk of Fame in Richmond, Indiana.

Legacy
Welk's band continues to appear in a dedicated theater in Branson, Missouri. In addition, the television show has been repackaged for broadcast on PBS stations, with updates from show performers appearing as wraparounds where the original shows had commercial breaks. The repackaged shows are broadcast at roughly the same Saturday night time slot as the original ABC shows, and special longer rebroadcasts are often shown during individual stations' fund-raising periods. These repackaged shows are produced by the Oklahoma Educational Television Authority.

The "Live Lawrence Welk Show" makes annual concert tours across the United States and Canada, featuring stars from the television series, including Ralna English, Mary Lou Metzger, Gail Farrell, and Anacani.

In popular culture
The comedy show Saturday Night Live had a recurring sketch during the late 2000s and early 2010s, in which Welk was portrayed by Fred Armisen.

Books by Welk
All of Welks books are coauthored by, or written in conjunction with, Bernice McGeehan and published by Prentice Hall, except where indicated:
 Wunnerful, Wunnerful: The Autobiography of Lawrence Welk, 1971, 
 Ah-One, Ah-Two! Life with My Musical Family, 1974, 
 My America, Your America, 1976, 
 Lawrence Welk's Musical Family Album, 1977, 
 Lawrence Welk's Bunny Rabbit Concert,  illustrated by Carol Bryan, Indianapolis: Youth Publications/Saturday Evening Post Co., 1977,  (children's book)
 You're Never Too Young, 1981, 

Singles

* "Shame On You" also made the US Country charts (No. 1) as well as its flip side, "At Mail Call Today" (No. 3)** "Calcutta" also made the US R&B chart, reaching No. 10

See also
 The Lennon Sisters – mainstay singers for Welk from 1955 to 1968
 Aragon Ballroom (Ocean Park)

References

Further reading
 Coakley, Mary Lewis. Mister Music Maker, Lawrence Welk (1958).
 Govoni, Albert. The Lawrence Welk Story (1961)
 Kloberdanz, Timothy J. "Symbols of German-Russian Ethnic Identity on the Northern Plains." Great Plains Quarterly 8#1 (1988): 3–15  online.
 Miller, John. "From the Great Plains to LA: The Intersecting Paths of Lawrence Welk and Johnny Carson." Virginia Quarterly Review 79.2 (2003): 265.
 Miller, John E. "Lawrence Welk and John Wooden: Midwestern small-town boys who never left home." Journal of American Studies 38.1 (2004): 109–125.
 Schweinher, William K. Lawrence Welk: An American Institution (1980). 
 Vickery-Bareford, Melissa. "Welk, Lawrence" American National Biography (1999) https://doi.org/10.1093/anb/9780198606697.article.1803327 
 Zehnpfennig, Gladys. Lawrence Welk: Champagne Music Man'' (1968)

External links

Stars of the Lawrence Welk Show

North Dakota State Univ. database of Lawrence Welk Music Arrangements
Lawrence Welk's recordings in the 1920s and 1930s, along with other info
Welk Musical Family website
Welk Musical Family blog

 
1903 births
1992 deaths
20th-century accordionists
20th-century American businesspeople
20th-century American male musicians
American accordionists
American bandleaders
American people of German-Russian descent
Big band bandleaders
Burials at Holy Cross Cemetery, Culver City
Catholics from California
Catholics from North Dakota
Coral Records artists
Deaths from bronchopneumonia
Deaths from pneumonia in California
Dot Records artists
Easy listening musicians
Gennett Records artists
Mercury Records artists
Musicians from Los Angeles
Musicians from North Dakota
People from Emmons County, North Dakota
Polka musicians
Sweet band musicians
Television personalities from Los Angeles